Vilanur is a village in the Avadaiyarkoil revenue block of Pudukkottai district, Tamil Nadu, India.

References

Villages in Pudukkottai district